This is a list of rivers in the Nadia district, located in the West Bengal state of India.

The district has four important rivers:
 Jalangi River
 Hooghly River 
 Churni River 
 Bidyadhari River
 
Other rivers that originate from the Nadia district:
 Mathabhanga River 
 Bhairab River
 Ichamati River
Trans-boundary rivers between the Nadia district and Bangladesh:
 Padma River
 Mathabhanga River

Nadia district
Nadia
West Bengal-related lists